Miss Teen Intercontinental is an international beauty pageant.

The current titleholder is Stefany Calero Molina of Curaçao who was crowned on October 19, 2022, in Guayaquil, Ecuador.

History

1973 to 1983 

The first Miss Teen Intercontinental was held already back in 1973, when it was called Miss Teenage Peace International. Barbara Jean Sergi from the United States was crowned at the end of the event held at the Aruba Sheraton Hotel on September 8, 1973.

In 1974 the pageant changed its name to Miss Teenage Intercontinental. And in 1979 the named officially changed into Miss Teen Intercontinental. In 1982 its name was changed to "Miss Intercontinental". In 1984 the competition was discontinued.

2005 to present 

In 2005, Ecuadorian producer César Montecé relaunched and organized the contest at the Oro Verde hotel in Guayaquil, Ecuador. It was held for five consecutive years under the direction of the Queen of Ecuador company represented by Montecé.

In 2012, the international pageant was held at the Edmundo Valdez Coliseum in the city of Milagro, after two years of absence. Since then, the organization has been headed by its President Rodrigo Moreira, who is the owner of the trademark rights.

Competition
The competition consists of interview, introduction round, national costume, swimsuit, evening gown and question answer round.

Winners

1No pageant was held in 2020 due to the global restrictions on public events and international travel imposed by the COVID-19 pandemic.

Countries/Territory by winning number

See also
Miss Teen Ecuador

References

External links
 Miss Teen Intercontinental Site

Beauty pageants in Ecuador
Ecuadorian awards
International beauty pageants
Beauty pageants for youth